Maria von Welser (born 26 June 1946 in Munich) is a German TV journalist and the President of UNICEF Germany.

She is by marriage a member of the preeminent banking and merchant family Welser. She is also the daughter of Margarete Schüssel, German fashion journalist.

Honours 

 Elisabeth-Selbert-Preis (2007)
 Bundesverdienstkreuz (1996)
 Hanns Joachim Friedrichs Award (1996)
 Publizistikpreis der Landeshauptstadt München (1996)
 Frauenförderpreis für besonderes Engagagement von Frauen für Frauen (1996)
 Theodor-Heuss-Medaille (1996)
 Elisabeth-Norgall-Preis (1994, vom International Women’s Club of Frankfurt)
 Frau des Jahres (1993)
 Journalistenpreis der Deutschen Aids-Stiftung (1992)
 Silberne Ehrennadel der Stiftung Sicherheit im Skisport des DSV (1987)

Publications 
 Maria von Welser, Münchner Oktoberfest Bummel, München 1982, 
 Maria von Welser, Ursula von der Leyen, Wir müssen unser Land für die Frauen verändern. C. Bertelsmann, Munich, 2007, 
 Maria von Welser, Leben im Teufelskreis: Kinderarmut in Deutschland – und keiner sieht hin, Gütersloher Verlagshaus, 2009,

References

External links

1946 births
Living people
German television journalists
German women television journalists
Recipients of the Cross of the Order of Merit of the Federal Republic of Germany
ZDF people